The Elephant Trunk Hill is a hill, landmark and tourist attraction in Guilin, Guangxi, China.  It is not only one of the major tourist attractions of Guilin, an international tourist city, but also the symbol of Guilin, which uses elephant trunk mountain and osmanthus flower as its city emblem. [2]The Elephant Trunk Hill formerly known as Li Mountain, also known as Yi mountain, Chen Shui mountain, referred to as elephant mountain. In 1986, Xiang Shan park was built in accordance with Xiang Shan mountain. The main part of the park is Xiang Shan mountain and water moon, the ancient building Yun Feng temple, the love island, and the Ming dynasty building Pu Xian pagoda. [3]
Elephant Trunk Hill is the symbol of the city of Guilin.  It got its name because it looks like an elephant drinking water.  The round opening that would be under the elephant’s trunk is known as Water-Moon Cave because at night the reflection of the moon can be seen through the arch and it looks as if it is under the water and floating on the surface of the water at the same time.  Elephant Trunk Hill and Water-Moon Cave are located at the confluence of the Taohua River and the Lijiang River.[1]

The related legends: According to legend, the elephant trunk mountain was transformed from the god image in the sky. It turned out that this elephant was the god who carried the vase for the emperor of heaven. One year, the emperor of heaven went out on a hunting expedition. With a mighty procession, a hundred elephants, hundreds of heavenly horses and dozens of divine chariots passed by guilin, a city with beautiful mountains and rivers. Tian di's large group of troops trampled on a large area of fields, flowers and plants crops were ravaged, pigs, horses, cattle and sheep were slaughtered, the beautiful guilin bare land thousands of miles, a tragic scene. An elephant fell ill by the side of the road due to exhaustion. When the emperor of heaven saw it dying, he left it and took the other soldiers and horses with him. When the elephant was dying, an old man named xiang gong and xiang Po rescued it. Under the care of mother and father, the elephant recovered quickly. In return for the old man's saving his life, the elephant went to the fields to cultivate land for the public and the farmers, and vowed never to return to heaven. Farmers came to thank the elephants for their help. The emperor of heaven ordered the slaves to go back to guilin to look for the sick god because an elephant was missing from the procession. When the elephant slave came to guilin, he saw the elephant tilling the fields for the peasants and scolded it for losing the identity and face of the god of heaven. The elephant said, "can you, I and the emperor of heaven only eat what the peasants grow and not do anything for them? I will never go back to be a slave to the emperor of heaven." When the emperor of heaven heard that the god elephant refused to go to heaven, he took the heavenly soldier to catch the elephant. The elephant raised his trunk and defended himself bravely. He fought for three days and nights with the soldiers of heaven. When the emperor of heaven saw that the elephant was so brave that he would lose too many soldiers and generals, he thought of a cruel plan. He said to the elephant, "you are a fierce warrior. I like you very much. Say that finish, take day soldier day will withdraw day go up. The elephant listened to the emperor of heaven and was completely off guard. So he went to the lijiang river and drank water to quench his thirst. Just as it hung down its long nose to drink water, the emperor of heaven quietly walked up behind it and plunged his long sword into the elephant's body. The elephant was dead, but it did not fall. As time went by, the god turned into a magnificent elephant trunk mountain. From afar, the elephant trunk, elephant body, elephant tail everywhere clear. The small bottle-shaped tower on the mountain is said to be the hilt left by the emperor of heaven. In fact, this ancient pagoda was built in the Ming dynasty, engraved with the bodhisattva puxian, called "puxian pagoda", also known as "bottle pagoda".[3]

See also
Moon Hill, in Yangshuo County
Torghatten, in Norway

References

External links

 Elephant Trunk Hill (Xiangbishan) Travel China Guide

Geography of Guilin
Natural arches of China
Landforms of Guangxi
Tourist attractions in Guilin
Hills of China